The Volapük ü, Ꞟ in upper case and ꞟ in lower case, was an additional letter of the Latin alphabet that was used in the writing of the Volapük in the 19th century. It is now transcribed 'Ü ü' in Volapük.

This letter was proposed by Johann Martin Schleyer, with the letters ae ‹Ꞛ ꞛ› and oe ‹Ꞝ ꞝ› for the writing of the Volapük and was used briefly.

This letter, as well as the letters Ꞛ and Ꞝ were replaced in Volapük writing by the Latin letters with umlaut ‹Ä ä, Ö ö, Ü ü› at the Munich Congress of 1887.

Computer representation 
The Volapük ü can be represented with the following Unicode (Latin Extended-D) characters:

 
 
 

Latin letters with diacritics
Volapük
19th-century introductions